The Stracha is a river of Belarus. It is a right tributary of the Vilija (Neris). The river has a length of 59 km and has a basin area of 1140 km2. The average discharge of water at the mouth is 9.1 m³/s. The average slope of the surface water is 1%. Tributaries of the Stracha include the Lyntupka, Svirytsa and the Tushchanka. The Lake Yedigei lies along the river.

On February 2, 1944, the Battle of Stracha took place between the Polish and the Soviets.

References
Ресурсы поверхностных вод СССР. Описание рек и озёр и расчёты основных характеристик их режима. Т. 5. Белоруссия и Верхнее Поднепровье. Ч. 1–2. –Л., 1971.  • Природа Белоруссии: Попул. энцикл./ БелСЭ; Редкол.: И.П. Шамякин (гл.ред.) и др. –Мн.: БелСЭ, 1986. –599 с., 40 л. ил.  • Блакітная кніга Беларусі: Энцыкл. / БелЭн; Рэдкал.: Н.А. Дзісько і інш. — Мн.: БелЭн, 1994. —

Rivers of Grodno Region
Rivers of Minsk Region
Rivers of Vitebsk Region
Rivers of Belarus